Neem Chandra Bhowmik is a Professor in the Department of Applied Physics at the University of Dhaka and a leader of the Hindu minority community in Bangladesh. He is the former Ambassador of Bangladesh to Nepal with a controversial term. He is the President of Bangladesh Hindu Buddhist Christian Unity Council.

Career 
Bhowmik was the General Secretary of Bangladesh Hindu Buddhist Christian Unity Council in 1996.

Bhowmik signed a statement condemning the alleged harassment of Indian diplomat Sarbajit Chakraborti's wife Rupa Chakraborti by Bashundhara Group chairman, Ahmed Akbar Sobhan and his staff.

In September 2007, Bangladesh Army personal stationed at University of Dhaka and students of the university got into violent clashes with each other. Bhowmik was then the chairperson of the Applied Physics Department of the University of Dhaka. He was detained by Bangladesh Police on charges on instigating the students.

On 22 July 2009, the Awami League government appointed Bhowmik Ambassador of Bangladesh to Nepal. He was also the president of Bangladesh Muktijodha Foundation and Bangladesh Puja Udjapan Parishad. He was serving as the General Secretary of Bangladesh Hindu Buddhist Christian Unity Council. In March 2008, a court found him innocent of all charges.

In July 2010, Bhowmik was awarded the Mother Teresa Gold Medal.

In July 2011, Nepal informed Bangladesh using informal channels that they wished for the withdrawal of Bhowmik from Nepal. According to a report of the Foreign Ministry of Bangladesh, Bhowmik was implicated in a number of irregularities. He had behaved and acted unprofessionally and violated diplomatic norms. He was found being involved in internal politics of Nepal. The report also mentioned Bhowmik had taken kickbacks from Nepali students for providing them with scholarships from the government of Bangladesh. He was accused of stalking and harassing Manisha Koirala, a Nepali film actress. The report notes he was accused of harassing Mrs Apoorva Srivastava, a spokeswoman of the Indian Embassy in Nepal. He drove around Indian Army General J. F. R. Jacob in Nepal in an official embassy car while flying the Indian flag and at a Mujibnagar, the first government of Bangladesh, anniversary day event he called for the playing of anthems of Bangladesh, India, and Nepal. The First Secretary of the Bangladesh Embassy in Nepal, Nasreen Jahan Lipi, had made official complaints to Foreign Minister of Bangladesh, Dipu Moni, in 2010. He was also accused of harassing numerous women and having unprofessional relations with Bangladesh and Nepali women on embassy premises.  The government established an investigation committee to look into the allegations of the report. Next year the government issued an order to not extend the term of Bhowmik as ambassador ending his ambassadorship.

In January 2022, Bhowmik was elected President of Bangladesh Hindu Buddhist Christian Unity Council.

References 

Living people
Year of birth missing (living people)
Ambassadors of Bangladesh to Nepal
Academic staff of the University of Dhaka
Bangladeshi Hindus